Liran Cohen (born 14 February 1983 in Rishon LeZion) is an Israeli football player who plays for A.S. HaMakhtesh Giv'atayim.

Career

Club
He previously played for Maccabi Tel Aviv, Maccabi Petah Tikva and Bnei Yehuda.

A former key player for Maccabi Tel Aviv, and despite his lack of experience in Europe he has scored several important goals for Maccabi in their last campaigns in the UEFA Cup and in the UEFA Champions League.

In August 2011, he was loaned to Podbeskidzie Bielsko-Biała on a half-year deal.

In January 2013, Cohen signed at Hapoel Haifa.

International
At international level, Cohen was capped for the Israel national under-21 football team.

References

External links
 

1983 births
Living people
Israeli Jews
Israeli footballers
Maccabi Petah Tikva F.C. players
Maccabi Tel Aviv F.C. players
Bnei Yehuda Tel Aviv F.C. players
Bnei Sakhnin F.C. players
Podbeskidzie Bielsko-Biała players
Hapoel Haifa F.C. players
Hapoel Ramat Gan F.C. players
Hapoel Nir Ramat HaSharon F.C. players
Hapoel Kfar Shalem F.C. players
Hapoel Kiryat Ono F.C. players
Shimshon Tel Aviv F.C. players
Israeli Premier League players
Ekstraklasa players
Liga Leumit players
Israeli expatriate footballers
Expatriate footballers in Poland
Israeli expatriate sportspeople in Poland
Footballers from Rishon LeZion
Association football midfielders
Israel under-21 international footballers